Washptah, with the second name Izi, was an ancient Egyptian official in the Fifth Dynasty under king Neferirkare Kakai. His most important title was that of a vizier, making him to the most important official at the royal court, only second to the king. Next to the office of the vizier he hold several other important positions, including overseer of the scribes of the king's document and overseer of all royal works.

Washptah is mainly known from his mastaba in North Saqqara. It was recorded by Gaston Maspero who assigned to it the number D38. In his tomb is recorded a biographical inscription that reports that Washptah visited a building site of king Neferirkare, he got ill and the king was sending physicians for help. The text is not well preserved so that several details remain unclear. It seems that Washptah died and the king took care of building a tomb and a funerary cult. The inscription was made by the eldest son of Washptah.

References

Literature 

Viziers of the Fifth Dynasty of Egypt
Neferirkare Kakai
Ancient Egyptian overseers of royal works